Rotularia is an extinct genus of planispirally coiled fossil polychaete worms in the family Serpulidae. Owing to the gastropod-like shape of Rotularia, many authors in the past interpreted this genus as being sea snails in the family Vermetidae.

All Rotularia species were cemented to the substrate during their earliest growth stage, but they became detached shortly after the formation of the first whorls (Savazzi, 1995). Their tubes have two layers with different microstructure (Vinn, 2008). This genus is known from the early Kimmeridgian to Late Eocene (Jäger, 2004).

References

Jäger, M. 2004. Serpulidae und Spirorbidae (Polychaeta sedentaria) aus Campan und Maastricht von Norddeutschland, den Niederlanden, Belgien und angrenzenden Gebieten. Geologisches Jahrbuch (A) 157, 121–249. 
Savazzi, E. 1995. Morphology and mode of life of the polychaete Rotularia. Paläontologische Zeitschrift 69, 73–85.

Serpulidae
Prehistoric annelid genera
Kimmeridgian genus first appearances
Eocene genus extinctions
Late Jurassic invertebrates
Late Cretaceous invertebrates
Paleocene invertebrates
Eocene invertebrates
Fossil taxa described in 1827
Early Cretaceous invertebrates